Semiclassical physics, or simply semiclassical refers to a theory in which one part of a system is described quantum mechanically whereas the other is treated classically. For example, external fields will be constant, or when changing will be classically described. In general, it incorporates a development in powers of Planck's constant, resulting in the classical physics of power 0, and the first nontrivial approximation to the power of (−1). In this case, there is a clear link between the quantum-mechanical system and the associated semi-classical and classical approximations, as it is similar in appearance to the transition from physical optics to geometric optics.

Instances

Some examples of a semiclassical approximation include:

 WKB approximation: electrons in classical external electromagnetic fields.
 semiclassical gravity: quantum field theory within a classical curved gravitational background (see general relativity).
 quantum chaos; quantization of classical chaotic systems.
 magnetic properties of materials and astrophysical bodies under the effect of large magnetic fields (see for example De Haas–Van Alphen effect)
 quantum field theory, only Feynman diagrams with at most a single closed loop (see for example one-loop Feynman diagram) are considered, which corresponds to the powers of Planck's constant.

See also

 Bohr model
 Correspondence principle
 Classical limit
 Eikonal approximation
 Einstein–Brillouin–Keller method
 Old quantum theory

References

 
 
 
 

Quantum mechanics
Quantum field theory
Quantum chemistry
Theoretical chemistry
Theoretical physics
Computational chemistry